John Earl Armstrong (born July 7, 1963) is a former professional American football defensive back in the National Football League. He attended the University of Richmond and played with the Buffalo Bills in 1987.

External links
Pro-Football reference

1963 births
Living people
People from Calhoun City, Mississippi
Players of American football from Mississippi
Buffalo Bills players
Richmond Spiders football players